This is a list of the political leaders of Welsh council areas.

References 

Political leaders
Principal areas by political leadership